Johann Friedrich Klotzsch (9 June 1805 – 5 November 1860) was a German pharmacist and botanist.

His principal work was in the field of mycology, with the study and description of many species of mushroom.

Klotzsch was born in Wittenberg. Originally trained as a pharmacist, he later enrolled in pharmaceutical and botanical studies in Berlin. In 1830–32 he was curator of William Jackson Hooker's herbarium at the University of Glasgow. Beginning in 1834 he collected plants in Saxony, Bohemia, Austria, Styria and possibly Hungary. In 1838 he replaced Adelbert von Chamisso (1781–1838) as curator and director of the Royal Herbarium in Berlin.

The plant genus Klotzschia from the family Apiaceae, and some plant species like Eugenia klotzschiana or Acianthera klotzschiana are named in his honour.

Selected works
Mykologische Berichtigungen zu der nachgelassenen Sowerbyschen Sammlung, so wie zu den wenigen in Linneschen Herbarium vorhandenen Pilzen nebst Aufstellung einiger ausländischer Gattungen und Arten (Mycological determinations for the addenda to the Sowerby collection, a few of the fungi on stock in the Linnaean herbarium, with a presentation of some of the foreign genera and species) 
Herbarium vivum mycologicum sistens fungorum per totam Germaniam crescentium collectionem perfectam (Living mycological herbarium for the increase and perfection of the collection of all the fungi of Germany) (1832). This work is an exsiccata.

References

1805 births
1860 deaths
19th-century German botanists
Members of the Prussian Academy of Sciences
Scientists from Wittenberg
People from the Province of Saxony